BBC Live is a live album by Violent Femmes recorded in May 1991 at The Town & Country Club in London for BBC Radio 1's In Concert series, and broadcast on 20 July 1991.  It was released on Hux Records in 2005.

Track listings

Personnel
 Gordon Gano – vocals, guitar
 Brian Ritchie – bass, backing vocals
 Victor DeLorenzo – drums, backing vocals

References

Violent Femmes live albums
2005 live albums
BBC Radio recordings